The goalball women's tournament was contested from 25 August to 3 September. There were ten teams consisting of six players split into two groups: Group C and Group D.

Turkey were the defending Paralympic champions. They successfully defended their title by beating the United States in the gold medal match.

Participating teams

Group C

Group D

Preliminary round

Group C

Group D

Knockout stage

Bracket

Quarterfinals

Semi-finals

Bronze medal match

Gold medal match

Final ranking

References 

Women's tournament